PostAuto Switzerland, PostBus Ltd. (known as  in Swiss Standard German,  in Swiss French,  in Swiss Italian, and  in Romansh is a subsidiary company of the Swiss Post, which provides regional and rural bus services throughout Switzerland, and also in France, Germany, and Liechtenstein.

The Swiss PostAuto service evolved as a motorized successor to the stagecoaches that previously carried passengers and mail in Switzerland, with the Swiss postal service providing postbus services carrying both passengers and mail. Although this combination had been self-evident in the past, the needs of each diverged towards the end of the twentieth century, when the conveyance of parcels was progressively separated from public transportation. This split became official with the conversion of PostAuto into a separate subsidiary of the Swiss Post in February 2005.

The buses operated by PostAuto are a Swiss icon, with a distinctive yellow livery and three-tone horn. The company uses an image of a posthorn as a logo on its buses and elsewhere. On some mountain roads, indicated by a traffic sign of a yellow posthorn on a blue background, the public transport, in particular the postal buses, have priority over other traffic and traffic users must follow instructions by public transport drivers.

History
1849: Creation of the postal network diligence.
1906: First service of PostBus between Bern and Detligen.
1919: Inauguration of the line crossing the Simplon Pass.
1921: Grimsel Pass, Furka Pass, San Bernardino Pass, and Oberalp Pass are open to traffic.
1923: A three-tone horn is installed on the buses travelling on mountain routes.
1949: The bus lines of the Principality of Liechtenstein are operated by PostBus.
1959: All buses are of the same yellow color.
1961: Last service of horse diligence on the line Avers-Juf.
2003: For the first time, PostBus carries more than 100 million passengers.
2005: PostBus Switzerland established as a subsidiary company of Swiss Post
2006: PostBus celebrates its centenary.
2011: PostBus launches free WiFi in Postbuses and becomes the first Swiss public transport operator to add fuel cell buses to its fleet.

Operations

Switzerland
Services are provided by PostAuto Switzerland, a subsidiary company of Swiss Post with its headquarters in Bern. The routes are either operated directly by PostAuto itself, or by local bus companies under contract.

PostAuto offers extensive services in public, public-private, and private transit, including:
PostAuto: Bus lines (municipal, regional, long-distance, and vacation transportation)
PubliCar: Dial-a-bus service for lightly traveled routes
ScolaCar: Small buses for student transportation
PostCar: Tourist travel (chartered)

France
CarPostale France, a subsidiary of PostBus Switzerland, operated bus services in France. The company was headquartered in Lyon, with operations from Haguenau, in Alsace, to Béziers, in Languedoc-Roussillon. In September 2019 the business was sold to Keolis.

Liechtenstein
PostBus Switzerland also operates the bus service for Liechtenstein.

Germany
The German villages of Büsingen am Hochrhein (an exclave of Germany entirely surrounded by Swiss territory) and Randegg are also served via a connection with the Swiss towns of Schaffhausen and Ramsen.
The German town Singen benefits from a connection to Switzerland via a PostBus service to and from Ramsen.

Coaches
During most of the 20th century, PostAuto coaches were made in Switzerland by either Saurer, Berna, or FBW.

Criticism 
In June 2018, members of the Executive Board of PostAuto were dismissed by Swiss Post after PostAuto manipulated its accounting records concealing profits in order to collect excess subsidies.

See also
Swiss Federal Railways
List of highest paved roads in Switzerland

References

External links

PostBus 
Original sound of Post horn (MP3)
Sound of Post horn (MP3)

Bus companies of Switzerland